Fengky Turnando (born on January 1, 1991) is an Indonesian professional footballer who played as a midfielder.

References

External links
 Fengky Turnando at Liga Indonesia
 Fengky Turnando at Soccerway

1991 births
Association football midfielders
Living people
Indonesian footballers
Liga 1 (Indonesia) players
Persiba Balikpapan players
People from Balikpapan
Sportspeople from East Kalimantan